The Manalapan-Englishtown Regional School District is a regional public school district serving students in pre-kindergarten through eighth grade from the suburban communities of Englishtown and Manalapan Township in Monmouth County, New Jersey, United States.

As of the 2019–20 school year, the district, comprised of eight schools, had an enrollment of 4,910 students and 408.4 classroom teachers (on an FTE basis), for a student–teacher ratio of 12.0:1.

The district is classified by the New Jersey Department of Education as being in District Factor Group "GH", the third-highest of eight groupings. District Factor Groups organize districts statewide to allow comparison by common socioeconomic characteristics of the local districts. From lowest socioeconomic status to highest, the categories are A, B, CD, DE, FG, GH, I and J.

Students from the two communities in public school for ninth through twelfth grades attend either Manalapan High School (all students from Englishtown and some from Manalapan) or Freehold Township High School (which serves other Manalapan students), as part of the Freehold Regional High School District. The Freehold Regional High School District also serves students from Colts Neck Township, Farmingdale, Freehold Borough, Freehold Township, Howell Township and Marlboro Township. As of the 2019–20 school year, the high school had an enrollment of 1,879 students and 122.8 classroom teachers (on an FTE basis), for a student–teacher ratio of 15.3:1 and Freehold Township High School had an enrollment of 2,029 students and 133.2 classroom teachers (on an FTE basis), for a student–teacher ratio of 15.2:1.

History
In June 1963, voters approved a referendum by a more than 10-1 margin changing from a consolidated to a regional district. The approval of the regionalization proposal meant that the  district was eligible for increased state aid and would have property taxes allocated to the two municipalities based on the number of students enrolled from each community.

Population growth in the two constituent municipalities has led to enrollment growing to 3,200 by the early 1980s to more than 5,000 in 2017. The student body is primarily from Manalapan Township, which accounts for about 95% of enrollment, with Englishtown students accounting for the remaining 5%.

After the 1960 United States census, Manalapan Township accounted for 78% of the district's overall population, with 22% from Englishtown. The population in Englishtown increased from 1,143 in 1960 to 1,847 in 2010, an increase of more than 60%, while Manalapan Township grew almost tenfold, from 3,990 to 38,872, over that same period, so that the population ratio between Manalapan Township and Englishtown is nearly 20:1.

Awards and recognition 
Clarks Mills School was one of nine schools in New Jersey honored in 2020 by the National Blue Ribbon Schools Program, which recognizes high student achievement.

Schools 
Schools in the district (with 2019–20 enrollment from the National Center for Education Statistics) are:
Preschool
John I. Dawes Early Learning Center with 365 students in PreK and K
Melissa Foy, Principal
Elementary schools
Clark Mills School with 491 students in grades 1-5
Jayme Orlando, Principal
Lafayette Mills School with 489 students in grades 1-5
Gregory T. Duffy, Principal
Milford Brook School with 523 students in grades K-5
Jodi Pepchinski, Principal
Taylor Mills School with 600 students in grades K-5
Kerry Marsala, Principal
Wemrock Brook School with 626 students in grades 1-5
Beverly Wilpon, Principal
Middle schools
Pine Brook School with 563 students in sixth grade
Julie Szustowicz, Principal  
Manalapan-Englishtown Middle School with 1,227 students in grades 7 and 8
Dr. Michael Fiorillo, Principal
Adi "A.C. is cool" Chodaree, student and creator of the app Trackie

In the news 
Starting September 12, 2006, the approximately 1,400 students of Manalapan-Englishtown Middle School had to learn in the elementary and intermediate schools as the district's middle school building was not yet ready for use. Inspections had identified between 100 and 300 code violations, and the school could not be granted a certificate of occupancy. While the building was being completed, students attended school on the school's four-hour day schedule in cafeterias, gymnasiums, auditoriums, and empty classrooms in the elementary and intermediate schools. As of September 25, 2006, students resumed a full day schedule at the Manalapan-Englishtown Middle School.

During the COVID-19 pandemic, the district superintendent John Marciante abided by the New Jersey state government's policies in regards to the wearing of face masks in order to protect the wider community against the spread of the virus.  On June 8, 2021, amidst rising summer temperatures, some parents became concerned that wearing masks would become a greater health concern than COVID.  A group of such parents gathered during the Board of Education meeting in the evening of June 8, 2021, to protest, and persuaded the Board of Education to place Marciante on administrative leave through the end of the academic year, June 22.  Immediately after, the board passed a motion to allow each individual parent to decide whether his or her child would attend school without a mask against government policies.

Administration
Core members of the district's administration are:
Dr. Nicole Santora, Superintendent
Veronica Wolf, Business Administrator / Board Secretary

Board of education
The district's board of education, comprised of nine members, sets policy and oversees the fiscal and educational operation of the district through its administration. As a Type II school district, the board's trustees are elected directly by voters to serve three-year terms of office on a staggered basis, with three seats up for election each year held (since 2012) as part of the November general election. The board appoints a superintendent to oversee the day-to-day operation of the district. Seats on the nine-member board are allocated based on population, with eights seats assigned to Manalapan Township and one to Englishtown.

References

External links 
Manalapan-Englishtown Regional School District

School Data for the Manalapan-Englishtown Regional School District, National Center for Education Statistics
Archives of Manalapan-Englishtown Middle School's online newspaper

1963 establishments in New Jersey
Englishtown, New Jersey
Manalapan Township, New Jersey
New Jersey District Factor Group GH
School districts established in 1963
School districts in Monmouth County, New Jersey